Gaetana Goldoni Andolfati (Venice. 1768 - Modena, 1830) was an actress, mainly in comedy, and active mainly in Northern Italy.

She is the daughter of the actor known  for playing the role of Pantalone, Bartolomeo Andolfati. She trained with her father and then worked in the company of G. Grassi, and later in the company established by her brother Pietro Andolfati, the father of the actor Giovanni Andolfati. She married the actor Antonio Goldoni, and became a lead actress in his company. Till 1818, when she widowed and continued to work in the company with the son of Gaetana's sister Ana, (P. Riva), and continued the company after her nephew's death .

Colomberti, a contemporary described her as loose and playful in the comedy, noble and sensitive in the drama, statuesque in her gestures and  imposing in declaiming tragedy. She was celebrated in a number of different roles including Merope in a play by Maffei, and in various heroine roles of Alfieri plays. Her most celebrated performance was as Semiramide in a play by Voltaire (translated by Pietro Andolfati).

Sources

 Treccani Encyclopedia entry.

Italian stage actresses
18th-century Italian actresses
19th-century Italian actresses
1768 births
1830 deaths
Commedia dell'arte
Writers from Venice